Fura-2-acetoxymethyl ester, often abbreviated Fura-2AM, is a membrane-permeant derivative of the ratiometric calcium indicator Fura-2 used in biochemistry to measure cellular calcium concentrations by fluorescence.  When added to cells, Fura-2AM crosses cell membranes and once inside the cell, the acetoxymethyl groups are removed by cellular esterases. Removal of the acetoxymethyl esters regenerates "Fura-2", the pentacarboxylate calcium indicator.  Measurement of Ca2+-induced fluorescence at both 340 nm and 380 nm allows for calculation of calcium concentrations based 340/380 ratios. The use of the ratio automatically cancels out certain variables such as local differences in fura-2 concentration or cell thickness that would otherwise lead to artifacts when attempting to image calcium concentrations in cells.

References

Biochemistry methods
Cell culture reagents
Cell imaging
Fluorescent dyes
Oxazoles
Benzofuran ethers at the benzene ring
Acetate esters
Formals